The Black Sabbath Story Vol. 1 - 1970–1978: is a documentary about the heavy metal band Black Sabbath that recounts their history from the days of "Earth" (one of their first names), to the separation with Ozzy Osbourne. A DVD version has been released in 2002, with 35 minutes of additional footage, including a promotional video of "A Hard Road" not included in the previous VHS version.

Track listing 
Standard Edition
 "N.I.B."
 "Paranoid"
 "War Pigs"
 "Children of the Grave"
 "Snowblind"
 "Sabbath Bloody Sabbath"
 "Symptom of the Universe"
 "It's Alright"
 "Rock 'n' Roll Doctor"
 "Never Say Die"

DVD Bonus Track
"A Hard Road"

Personnel 
 Ozzy Osbourne
 Tony Iommi
 Geezer Butler
 Bill Ward

Certifications

References 

Documentary films about heavy metal music and musicians
Black Sabbath
Black Sabbath video albums
Sanctuary Records video albums